Spain competed at the 1994 European Athletics Championships in Helsinki, Finland, from 7–14 August 1994.

Medals

Results

Men
Track & road events

Field events

Combined events – Decathlon

Women
Track & road events

Field events

Nations at the 1994 European Athletics Championships
1994
European Athletics Championships